Bitch, Don't Let Me Die! is the twelfth album by Detroit rock band Electric Six and the eleventh in their official canon. It was released on Metropolis Records on October 2, 2015. It is the last album to feature longtime drummer Percussion World before his departure later in the year to join Flogging Molly.

Track listing 
 "Drone Strikes" – 2:40
 "Two Dollar Two" – 3:48
 "Kids Are Evil" – 3:04
 "Roulette!" – 2:58
 "A Variation of Elaine" – 2:51
 "Slow Motion Man" – 4:36
 "Big Red Arthur" – 3:43
 "Dime Dime Penny Dime" – 2:44
 "If U R Who U Say U R" – 3:43
 "When Cowboys File for Divorce" – 3:22
 "Take Another Shape" – 3:30
 "Electric Six!" – 2:28

Personnel
 Dick Valentine - vocals
 Tait Nucleus? - synthesizer
  - guitar
 Percussion World - drums
 Da Ve - guitar
 Rob Lower - bass
 Nicole Kathleen Tausney - background vocals

Legacy
 Dick Valentine recorded acoustic versions of "Roulette!" and "Take Another Shape" for his solo album "Quiet Time".
 The songs "Kids Are Evil", "Roulette!" and "Dime Dime Penny Dime" were featured in the band's mockumentary feature film "Roulette Stars of Metro Detroit".
 The band performed "Big Red Arthur" and "When Cowboys File for Divorce" on their second live album "You're Welcome!".
 The band will perform a stripped-down version of "Big Red Arthur" on their third live album Chill Out!.

References

External links
Electricsixnews

2015 albums
Electric Six albums
Metropolis Records albums